Wilhelm Middelschulte  (April 3, 1863, Werve, Kreis Hamm, now part of Kamen – May 4, 1943, Dortmund) was a German organist and composer who resided in America for most of his career.

Life

Middelschulte initially studied organ with August Knabe. In 1893, he gave three performances entirely from memory at the Columbian Exposition. From 1896 - 1918 he was organist for what would later become the Chicago Symphony Orchestra. During the 1920s, he regularly returned to his native Germany to give performances. He is regarded as one of the most significant organists of his time, and was critically acclaimed for his performances of Johann Sebastian Bach. In 1939, after nearly fifty years in America, Middelschulte returned to Germany, where he died only four years later.

His students included Virgil Fox and Cecilia Clare Bocard. 
Fox frequently used as an encore to his performances Middelschulte's "Perpetuum Mobile", an elaborate piece that builds from a subdued sound to, by the end, fortissimo and played almost entirely on the pedals; the penultimate measure contains an ascending scalar flourish and the last measure a single chord, both played on full organ.

Ferruccio Busoni's Fantasia contrappuntistica was dedicated to "Wilhelm Middelschulte, Meister der Kontrapunkte".

References
Die Musik in Geschichte und Gegenwart: Middelschulte, Wilhelm. Musik in Geschichte und Gegenwart, p. 51023 (cf. MGG vol. 16, p. 1276) Bärenreiter-Verlag 1986
Brink Bush, "Middelschulte, Wilhelm".  Grove Music Online, ed. L. Macy.  (Accessed 28 December 2007.)

External links
 

1863 births
1943 deaths
People from Kamen
German Romantic composers
20th-century classical composers
German classical organists
German male organists
People from the Province of Westphalia
Composers for pipe organ
German expatriates in the United States
German male classical composers
Pupils of Bernhard Ziehn
20th-century German composers
20th-century German male musicians
19th-century German male musicians
Male classical organists